Dawa or Dawah may refer to:
Dawa (Jurisdiction) (Arab. دعوى)
Dawa (Tibetan phrase), meaning "moon" or "month"
Dawa River, a river in Ethiopia
Dawah, proselytizing of Islam
Al Dawa, defunct political journal in Egypt
Dire Dawa, Ethiopia
Islamic Dawa Party, an Iraqi conservative political party
Dawa County (大洼县), Liaoning

Towns (大洼镇)
Dawa, Jilin, in Ningjiang District, Songyuan
Dawa, Dawa County, Liaoning
Dawa, Changtu County, Liaoning
Dawa Chik, One Month in (Tibetan)